Second League may refer to:

 Second League of Estonia
 Second League of the Republika Srpska
 Second League of Armed Neutrality
 Second League of Prizren
 Second League of Montenegro
 TFF Second League of Turkey